Fraxinus dipetala, the California ash or two-petal ash, is a species of ash native to southwestern North America in the United States in northwestern Arizona, California, southern Nevada, and Utah, and in Mexico in northern Baja California. It grows at altitudes of 100–1,300 m.

It is a deciduous shrub or small tree growing to 7 m tall, with cylindric to four-angled stems. The leaves are 5–19 cm long, light to dark green, with three to seven (rarely nine) leaflets 1–7 cm long, thick, and serrated along the margins. The flowers have two white lobe-shaped petals 2.5–4 mm long, and are sweetly scented, hanging in fluffy clusters; unlike many ashes, they are bisexual, not dioecious. The fruit is a long, flat samara 2–3.2 cm long and 5–9 mm broad, green when immature and hanging in bunches.

References

dipetala
Trees of the Southwestern United States
Trees of Baja California
Natural history of the California chaparral and woodlands
Flora of California
Flora of the Sierra Nevada (United States)
Natural history of the California Coast Ranges
Natural history of the Peninsular Ranges
Natural history of the San Francisco Bay Area
Natural history of the Santa Monica Mountains
Natural history of the Transverse Ranges
Plants described in 1839
Flora without expected TNC conservation status